Economic law may refer to:

Economic law, a legal system that governs relations associated with economic activities
Commercial law, laws that govern business and commercial transactions
Law of economics

See also Law and economics

Economic law